The Lilies of the Valley egg is a jewelled Fabergé egg made under the supervision of the Russian jeweller Peter Carl Fabergé in 1898 by Fabergé ateliers. The supervising goldsmith was Michael Perchin. The egg is one of the two eggs in the Art Nouveau style (the other is the Pansy Egg). It was presented on April 5 to Tsar Nicholas II, who gave it as a gift to his wife, the Tsarina, Empress Alexandra Fyodorovna. The egg is part of the Victor Vekselberg Collection, owned by The Link of Times Foundation and housed in the Fabergé Museum in Saint Petersburg, Russia.

Description
The egg is covered in pearls and topped with rose pink enamel on a guilloché field. The egg is supported by cabriole legs of green-gold leaves with rose-cut diamond dewdrops. The gold-stemmed lilies have green enameled leaves and flowers made of gold set with rubies, pearls, and diamonds.

Surprise
This egg's surprise is 'elevated' out of the egg by twisting a gold-mounted pearl button. When fully raised, three portraits are visible under the Imperial crown set with a ruby: Tsar Nicholas II and his two oldest daughters, Grand Duchess Olga and Grand Duchess Tatiana, painted on ivory by Johannes Zehngraf. The portraits are framed in rose diamonds and backed with gold panels engraved with the presentation date of July 31, 1898.

References

Sources

External links
Faberge - Treasures of Imperial Russia

Imperial Fabergé eggs
Art Nouveau works
1898 works
Fabergé Museum in Saint Petersburg, Russia